The Great Opportunity (German:Die große Gelegenheit) is a 1925 German silent film directed by Lorand von Kabdebo and starring Kurt Vespermann, Lia Eibenschütz and Colette Brettel. The production is notable as marking the filmmaking debut of Henry Koster, who co-wrote the screenplay. Koster would go on to become a top Hollywood film director.

Cast
 Kurt Vespermann 
 Lia Eibenschütz 
 Colette Brettel 
 Ernst Winar 
 Harry Nestor  
 Otz Tollen 
 Kurt Born 
 Rudolf Lettinger

References

Bibliography
 Bock, Hans-Michael & Bergfelder, Tim. The Concise CineGraph. Encyclopedia of German Cinema. Berghahn Books, 2009.

External links 
 

1925 films
Films of the Weimar Republic
German silent feature films
German black-and-white films